Estelle Hemsley (May 5, 1887 – November 5, 1968) was a prominent African American actress of stage and screen. She appeared in the stage and screen versions of Take a Giant Step, earning a Golden Globe nomination for Best Supporting Actress in the 1959 movie directed by Philip Leacock. Her other film roles include playing Grandmother Topouzoglou in Elia Kazan's 1963 movie America, America (nominated for the Oscar for Best Picture), the role of Cla-Cla in Mel Ferrer's 1959 film Green Mansions, the mother of Ruby Dee in Edge of the City (1957), and Catherine in Robert Mulligan's 1965 movie Baby the Rain Must Fall.

Filmography

References

External links 

 
 

1887 births
1968 deaths
20th-century American actresses
Actresses from Boston
African-American actresses
American film actresses
American stage actresses
20th-century African-American women
20th-century African-American people
Federal Theatre Project people